Group A of the 1999 Fed Cup Americas Zone Group I was one of two pools in the Americas Zone Group I of the 1999 Fed Cup. Five teams competed in a round robin competition, with the top team advancing to the Group I play-off, the winner of which would advance to World Group II Play-offs, and the bottom team being relegated down to 2000 Group II.

Colombia vs. Mexico

Paraguay vs. Ecuador

Argentina vs. Mexico

Colombia vs. Ecuador

Argentina vs. Paraguay

Mexico vs. Ecuador

Argentina vs. Ecuador

Colombia vs. Paraguay

Argentina vs. Colombia

Paraguay vs. Mexico

  failed to win any ties in the pool, and thus was relegated to Group II in 2000, where they placed first overall, and thus advanced back to Group I for 2001.

See also
Fed Cup structure

References

External links
 Fed Cup website

1999 Fed Cup Americas Zone